John 15 is the fifteenth chapter in the Gospel of John in the New Testament section of the Christian Bible. It is part of what New Testament scholars have called the 'farewell discourse' of Jesus. It has historically been a source of Christian teaching and Christological debate and reflection, and its images (particularly of Jesus as the vine) have been influential in Christian art and iconography. The chapter implies one of the highest and most developed Christologies to be found in the New Testament. The original text was written in Koine Greek. The book containing this chapter is anonymous, but early Christian tradition uniformly affirmed that John composed this Gospel.

Text
The original text was written in Koine Greek. This chapter is divided into 27 verses.

Textual witnesses
Some early manuscripts containing the text of this chapter are:
Codex Vaticanus (325-350; complete)
Codex Sinaiticus (330-360; complete)
Codex Bezae (~400; complete)
Codex Alexandrinus (400-440; complete)

Old Testament references
 : Psalm b; Psalm

Places 
The events and discourses recorded in this chapter and in the whole of chapters 13 to 17 took place in Jerusalem. The precise location is not specified, but  states that afterwards, "Jesus left with his disciples and crossed the Kidron Valley". Because the previous chapter ends with the words "Come now, let us go", Plummer, in the Cambridge Bible for Schools and Colleges, suggests that Jesus and his disciples have "rise[n] from table and prepare[d] to depart, but that the contents of the next three chapters (15-17) are spoken before they leave the room".

Analysis
The chapter presents Jesus speaking in the first person. Although ostensibly addressing his disciples, most scholars conclude the chapter is written with events concerning the later church in mind. Jesus is presented as explaining the relationship between himself and his followers—seeking to model this relationship on his own relationship with his Father.

The chapter introduces the extended metaphor of Christ as the true vine. The Father is the vinedresser, vinegrower or husbandman. His disciples are said to be branches (ta klémata, specifically meaning vine branches) which must 'abide' in him if they are to 'bear fruit'. The disciples are warned that barren branches are pruned by the vinedresser: see  : Every branch that does bear fruit is pruned so that it will bear more fruit - not barren branches.

The chapter proceeds by comparing the close relationship of Jesus and his disciples ('abiding') to that of himself and his Father. The disciples are reminded of the love of the Father and the Son, and the love of the Son for the disciples, and then exhorted to 'love one another' in the same manner.  speaks of the 'greater love' as being the willingness to 'lay down' one's life for friends. This text, which primarily refers to Jesus’ impending death, has since been widely used to affirm the sacrifice of martyrs and soldiers in war, and is thus often seen on war memorials and graves.

Jesus then speaks of being hated by the world, but he sees this hatred as fulfillment of the words in either Psalm 69, "They hated Me without a cause", or Psalm 35, "neither let them wink with the eye that hate me without a cause".

The chapter concludes by warning disciples to expect persecution and promises the gift of the parakletos (Paraclete or Holy Spirit God).

Verse 4
Abide in Me, and I in you. As the branch cannot bear fruit of itself, unless it abides in the vine, neither can you, unless you abide in Me.
The words μένῃ or μείνατε appear frequently in this chapter. Some early texts have μένητε: considering "the divided state" of the manuscript evidence, there in no certainty about whether μείνατε or μένητε is original. Typical translations are "abide", "remain", or "continue". Heinrich Meyer refers to "faithful persistence".

Verse 9As the Father loved Me, I also have loved you; abide in My love.Pope Francis suggests that here, "Jesus tells us something new about love: you are not only to love, but to abide in my love. In fact, the Christian vocation is to abide in God’s love".

Verse 16"You did not choose Me, but I chose you and appointed you that you should go and bear fruit, and that your fruit should remain, that whatever you ask the Father in My name He may give you".
The word "appointed" is translated as "ordained" in the King James Version and some other translations. Referring to the allegory of trees which have been planted, the reformation theologian Sebastian Castellio suggests destinavi, "I have marked out, or assigned you your place", as an alternative reading.

Verses 18-25
These verses speak of the world's hatred for the disciples. In the next chapter, Jesus explains why he has told the disciples these things.

Verse 26
“But when the Helper comes, whom I shall send to you from the Father, the Spirit of truth who proceeds from the Father, He will testify of Me".
The reference to the Spirit in verse 26, speaks of it as sent by the Son from the Father. This verse has been particularly influential in debates concerning the nature of the Trinity and in the filioque disputes between Eastern and Western Christianity.

See also
True Vine

Notes

References

Bibliography
Bultmann, Rudolf (1971), The Gospel of John, Blackwell

Linders, Barnabas (1972), The Gospel of John, Marshall Morgan and Scott

External links

 King James Bible - Wikisource
English Translation with Parallel Latin Vulgate
Online Bible at GospelHall.org (ESV, KJV, Darby, American Standard Version, Bible in Basic English)
Multiple bible versions at Bible Gateway (NKJV, NIV, NRSV etc.)
The Holy Bible, English Standard Version, quoting John 15 with footnotes

John 15